Mallorca is a Spanish geographical indication for Vino de la Tierra wines located in the island of Mallorca in the autonomous region of the Balearic Islands, Spain. Vino de la Tierra is one step below the mainstream Denominación de Origen indication on the Spanish wine quality ladder.

It acquired its Vino de la Tierra status in 2007.

Grape varieties
 Red: Callet, Manto negro, Cabernet sauvignon, Fogoneu, Merlot, Monastrell, Syrah, Tempranillo and Pinot noir
 White: Prensal or Moll, Chardonnay, Macabeo, Malvasía, Moscatel de Alejandría, Moscatel de grano menudo, Parellada, Riesling and Sauvignon blanc

References

External links
 Vino de la tierra de Formentera Página del Institut de Qualitat Agroalimentaria de las Islas Baleares

Spanish wine
Wine regions of Spain
Wine-related lists
Appellations
Culture of Mallorca
Balearic cuisine